This is a list of government owned and privately owned pharmacy schools in India. The Colleges are Approved by Pharmacy Council Of India (PCI) for conduction of D.Pharma or B.Pharma Course.

Arunachal Pradesh
 College of Pharmaceutical Sciences, Himalayan University, Itanagar, Arunachal Pradesh

Andhra Pradesh
Anwarul Uloom College of Pharmacy, New Mallepally, Hyderabad
 A.S.N Pharmacy College, Guntur DisT
 A.S.R. Govt. Junior College
 Adarsha College of Pharmacy
 Annamacharya College of Pharmacy
 B.V.K. Junior College, Dwarkanagar
 Balaji Institute of Pharmacy
 Bapatla College of Pharmacy
 Bojjam Narasimhulu Pharmacy College for Women
 Care College of Pharmacy
 Chalapathi Institute of Pharmaceutical Sciences, Guntur
 Deccan School of Pharmacy, Kanchanbagh
 Department of Pharmaceutical Sciences
 Dr. Samuel George Institute of Pharmaceutical Sciences, Thokapully Markapur
 Fathima Institute of Pharmacy, Pulivendula road, Kadapa
 G. Pulla Reddy College of Pharmacy
 Gokaraju Rangaraju College of Pharmacy
 Govt. Junior College, Warangal Dist
 Govt. Junior College, Srikakulam Dist
 Govt. Junior College, Anantpur Dist
 Govt. Junior College, Cuddapah Dist
 Govt. Junior College for Boys
 Govt. Junior College for Girls, Chuttiir Dist
 Govt. Polytechnic for Women, East Godavari
 Govt. Polytechnic for Women, Anantpur Dist
 Hindu College of Pharmacy Guntur
 Institute of Pharmaceutical Technology
 J.J. College of Pharmaceutical Sciences
 Jangaon Institute of Pharmaceutical Sciences
 K L R Pharmacy College
 K.D.R. Govt. Polytechnic
 K.V.S.R. Siddharatha College of Pharmaceutical Sciences
 Kakateeya Junior College, Cuddapah Dist
 Kamala Nehru Polytechnic for Women, Exhibition Grounds
 Krishnaveni Exhibition Society's
 L S Institute of Pharmaceutical Sciences
 L.A.Govt, Junior College for Girls,
 Mak college of pharmacy
 Madhira Institute of Technology & Science
 Malineni Lakshmaiah College of Pharmacy
 MLR Institute of Pharmacy
 Nalanda college of pharmacy
 Nalanda College of Pharmacy, Nalgonda
 NIPER Hyderabad
 Nirmal College or Pharmacy, Buddayapalle (P.O.)
 Nirmala College of Pharmacy Guntur, Mangalagiri (Mdl)
 Pragathi Pharmacy College
 Raghavendra Institute of Pharmaceutical Education & Research (RIPER), Chiyyedu (PO) Anantapuram (Dt)
 Ramakrishna Junior College
 Rao's College of Pharmacy
 S.V.Govt.Polytechnic, Chittoor Dist
 Sarada College of Pharmaceutical Sciences
 Sarojini Naidu Vanitha Mahavidyalaya, Mukkaramjahi Road
 Sasikanth Reddy College of Pharmacy
 Shadan College of Pharmacy, Himayat Sagar Road
 Shadan Women's College of Pharmacy, Khairtabad
 Shir V.C. Memorial Polytechnic, Cuddapah Dist
 Shri Vishnu College of Pharmacy, West Godavari District
 Siddhartha College of Pharmaceutical Sciences, Siddhartha Nagar
 Sir C.R.Reddy College, West Godavari Dist
 SKU College of Pharmacy
 Smt. Sarojini Ramulamma College of Pharmacy
 Sree Vidyanikethan College of Pharmacy, A.Rangampet, Chittoor Dist.
 Sri Dwarakanath Junior College, Chittoor Dist
 Sri G.Pulla Reddy Govt. Polytechnic
 Sri P. Rami Reddy Memorial College of Pharmacy, Utukur
 Sri Padmavathi Mahila Visvavidyalaya, Chittoor District
 Sri Padmavathi School of Pharmacy, Bypass Road, Chittoor District
 Sri Padmavathi Women's Polytechnic, Chittoor Dist
 Sri Vasavi Institute of Pharmaceutical Sciences, West Godavari District
 Sri Venkateshwara College of Pharmacy, By the Side of Iron Yard
 Sri Venkateswara College of Pharmacy, Sherlingampally Mandal
 Sri Venkateswara College of Pharmacy, RVS Nagar, Chittoor
 SRR College of Pharmaceutical Sciences
 St. Peter's Institute of Pharmaceutical Sciences
 Sultan-Ul-Uloom College of Pharmacy, Road No. 3, Banjara Hills
 Swathi College of Pharmacy, next to Nellore toll plaza, Venkatachalam Post & Mandal, Nellore
 Talla Padmavathi College of Pharmacy, near 100 ft Flyover Road
 University College of Pharmaceutical Sciences
 Vagdevi College of Pharmacy
 Vignan Pharmacy College
 Vignan's Institute of Pharmaceutical Sciences
 Vikas College of B.Pharmacy
 Vishwa Bharathi College of Pharmaceutical Sciences

Assam
 Department of Pharmaceutical Sciences
 Institute of Pharmacy Assam Medical College
 Institute of Pharmacy Guwahati Medical College, Guwahati
 Institute of Pharmacy Silchar Medical College, Silchar

Bihar
 B.R. Ambedkar Institute of Pharmacy Sciences
 Bihar College of Pharmacy
 Birla Institute of Technology
 Govt.Pharmacy Institute
 Kishanganj Pharmacy College
 Mother Teresa Institute of Pharmacy, P.O. Dhelwanm, Via-Lohia-Nagar
 Muzaffarpur Institute of Technology
 Patliputra College of Pharmacy, New Bailey Road
 R.L.S. Yadav College of Pharmacy, Kidwaipuri

Chhattisgarh
 Columbia Institute of Pharmacy, Tekari
 Govt. Women's Polytechnic, Raipur
 Institute of Pharmaceutical Sciences
 Raigarh college of pharmacy, Raigarh

Dadra and Nagar Haveli
 SSR College of Pharmacy, Sayli, Silvassa

Delhi
 Aditya College of Pharmacy, Vasant Gunj
 Baba Haridas College of Pharmacy, Jarodha Kalan
 Delhi Institute of Pharmaceutical Sciences and Research (DIPSAR)
 School of Pharmaceutical Sciences (SPS, DPSRU)
 Faculty of Pharmacy, Jamia Hamdard
 Maharaja Surajmal Institute of Pharmacy
 Mahatma Gandhi Institute Of Technology and Management (MGITI)
 St. Lawrence Pharmacy College, near Petrol Pump
 Subramaniam Bharati College of Science & Technology

Goa
Goa College of Pharmacy, Panaji

Gujarat
 Kalol Institute of Pharmacy, Kalol, North Gujarat
 Institute of Pharmacy, Nirma University, Ahmedabad
 A R College & G H Patel Institute of Pharmacy
 Atmiya Institute of Pharmacy, Rajkot
 B K Mody Government Pharmacy College
 C.U. Shah College of Pharmacy & Research, Kotharia Road
 Dr. Dayaram Patel Pharmacy College
 Faculty of Technology
 Indukaka Ipcowala College of Pharmacy
 Institute of Ayurvedic Pharmaceutical Sciences, Irwin Hospital Road
 K.B. Institute of Pharmaceutical Education & Research
 L.B. Rao Institute Of Pharmaceutical Education & Research
 L.J. Institute of Pharmacy, Ahmedabad 
 L. M. College of Pharmacy
 Maliba Pharmacy College
 NIPER Ahmedabad, Thaltej
 Noble Pharmacy College, Junagadh
 Parul Institute of Pharmacy
 Pharmacy Department
 ROFEL Shri G.M. Bilakhia College of Pharmacy, VAPI-396191. (W) Ta: PARDI
 Shantilal Shah Pharmacy College, Gaurishankar Lake Road
 Shir B.M. Shah college of Pharmaceutical Education and Research
 Shree Maruti Kelavani Mandal Trust Managed Diploma Pharmacy College
 Shree S K Patel College of Pharm Edu & Res, Taluk & Dist. Mehsana
 Shri B.M. Shah College of Pharmacy, P.O. Box No. 12
 Shri G.M. Patel College of Pharmacy, Ramba Kanya Chhatralaya Campus, Highway
 Shri Sarvajanik Pharmacy College
 Smt. Rupaben B. Patel Mahila Pharmacy College, Bhavnagar Road, Atkot, Jasdan Taluk
 Tolani Institute of Pharmacy, Nursery Garden, Ward 2/A, Adipur
 Vidyabharti Trust College of Pharmacy

Haryana
 B.P.S. Mahila Polytechnic, Somepat Dist
 Jhankar Pharmacy College Gurgaon, Haryana India.
 B.S. Anangpuria Institute of Pharmacy
 Bharat Institute of Pharmacy
 Dehat Vikas College of Pharmacy, District Faridabad
 Department of Pharmaceutical Sciences
 Doon Valley Institute of Pharmacy & Medicine
 Faculty of Engineering & Technology
 Gandhi college of Pharmacy
 Govt. Polytechnic
 Govt. Polytechnic
 Govt. Polytechnic for Women
 Guru Gobind Singh College of Pharmacy
 GVM College of Pharmacy
 Hindu College of Pharmacy
 Jan Nayak Ch. Devi Lal Memorial College of B. Pharmacy
 Janta College of Pharmacy
 Kurukshetra University Institute of Pharmaceutical Sciences
 Lord Shiva College of Pharmacy
 Maharaja Agarsain Technical Institute
 Maharshi Pharmacy College, Taraori
 P.D.M. College of Pharmacy, Sarai Aurangabad, Bahadurgarh
 Pt.B.D. Sharma Post-Graduate
 R.K.S.D. College of Pharmacy
 Rajendra Institutes of Technology & Sciences
 Ram Gopal College of Pharmacy, Farrukhnagar Tehsil
 SDD Institute of Pharmacy
 Shri Baba Mast Nath Inst of Pharm Sci
 SGT COLLEGE OF PHARMACY, SGT UNIVERSITY

Himachal Pradesh
 Government College of pharmacy Rohru, Shimla, H.P
 Government College of pharmacy Nagrota bagwan, kangra, H.P
 Government College of pharmacy  Rakar, kangra, H.P
 Government College of pharmacy seraj, Mandi, H.P
 Abhilashi College of Pharmacy
 Govt. Polytechnic
 Govt. Polytechnic for Women, Solan Dist
 Himalayan Institute of Pharmacy
 IEC School of Pharmacy, Baddi, Solan
 L.R. Institute of Pharmacy, Rajgarh roadhklh

Jharkhand
 Bokaro Institute of Medical & Health Sciences, Baradih, Jainamore, Bokaro, ssmt College Koderma

Karnataka
 Acharya & B.M Reddy College of Pharmacy, Hesaraghatta Road, Soladevanahalli
 Aditya Bangalore Institute of Pharmacy Education and Research, Yelahanka, Bangalore
 AECS Maaruti College of Pharmacy, Bannerghatta Road
 Al-Ameen College of Pharmacy
 Al-Falah College of Pharmacy
 Anupama College of Pharmacy, Mahalaxmipuram
 B.E.A's School of Pharmacy
 B.L.D.E. Association's College of Pharmacy
 B.L.D.E. Association's School of Pharmacy
 Bapuji Pharmacy College
 Basaveshwar College of Pharmacy
 Basaveshwara College of Pharmacy, Bidar Dist
 BES Institute of Pharmacy, Jayanagar
 Bharathi College of Pharmacy
 Oxbridge college of pharmacy (C.N.K. Reddy College of Pharmacy), mahadeshwar Nagar, herohalli cross, Magadi main road, Bangalore
 Chennigaramaih College of Pharmacy, Tumkur Dist
 CMR College of Pharmacy, HRBR Layout, 2nd Block
 College of Pharmaceutical Sciences
 College of Pharmacy, Sangolli Rayanna Nagar
 College of Pharmacy, CMH Road, Second Stage, Indiranagar, near Bata
 College of Pharmacy
 College of Pharmacy, Post Box No. 26
 D.R. Kari Gowda College of Pharmacy, Kuvempunagar
 Dayananda Sagar College of Pharmacy
 Dr H L Thimmegowda College of Pharmacy
 East West College of Pharmacy, 2nd Stage, Rajaji Nagar
 Farooquia College of Pharmacy, Tilak Nagar, Eidgah
 Friends Cultural Educational Society's, Thyagaraja Nagar
 G K M College of Pharmacy
 G.M. College of Pharmacy, Nelamangala, Bypass
 Golden College of Pharmacy
 Goutham College of Pharmacy
 Government College of Pharmacy
 H.K.E.S.'s College of Pharmacy
 Hillside College of Pharmacy and Research Centre
 Pharma Colleges in Karnataka
 Hanagal Shri Kumareshawr College of Pharmacy
 J S S College of Pharmacy
 K.C.T. College of Pharmacy, Qamar-ul Islam Colony, Roza
 K.L.E. Society's College of Pharmacy, Rajaijnagar
 K.L.E. Society's College of Pharmacy, J.N. Medical College Campus
 K.L.E. Society's College of Pharmacy, Gadag Dist
 K.L.E. Society's College of Pharmacy
 K.LE.'s College of Pharmacy
 K.R.E Society's Madam Mohan Harishchandra Goel Institute of Pharmacy, P.B. No. 53
 Karavali College of Pharmacy
 Karnataka College of Pharmacy
 Krupanidhi College of Pharmacy
 Luqman College of Pharmacy
 M.M.U. College of Pharmacy
 M S Ramaiah College of Pharmacy
 M.E.S College of Pharmacy, Arabic College Post
 M.M.J.G. College of Pharmacy, Gadag Dist
 Mallige College of Pharmacy, Chikkabanavara Post
 Maratha Mandal College of Pharmacy
 Milind Institute of Pharmacy
 Mohammadi College of Pharmacy
 Nargund College of Pharmacy, 100 ft Ring Road, Banashankari III Stage
 National College of Pharmacy
 NET Pharmacy College
 NGSM Institute of Pharmaceutical Sciences, Nanthoor
 Nitte Gulabi Shetty Memorial Institute of Pharmaceutical Sciences
 Niveditha College of Pharmacy, Bangalore road
 Noorie College of Pharmacy
 The Oxford College of Pharmacy, Hongasandra, Begur Road
 P E S College of Pharmacy
 Pandey College of Pharmacy, Naubad
 Pavan College of Pharmacy, Pavan Nagar P.C. Halli Extn
 Priyadarshini College of Pharmacy, Hanumanthpura
 R.R.K. Society College of Pharmacy
 Raman College of Pharmacy, Kurubarahalli
 Rani Chennamma College of Pharmacy, Vaibhav Nagar
 RR College of Pharmacy, Chikkabanavara
 Rural College of Pharmacy
 S C S College of Pharmacy
 S J M College of Pharmacy
 S V E T S College of Pharmacy
 S. A. C. College of pharmacy, Hassan Dist
 S. A. C. College of pharmacy, Nagamangala Taluk
 S.B.D. Institute of Pharmacy
 S.E.S. Pharmacy College
 S.J.M.M. College of Pharmacy, P.B.No. 47
 S.J.R.E Society's School of Pharmacy, Race Course Road
 Sardar V.V. Patil School of Pharmacy
 Sardavilas College of Pharmacy
 Seshadripuram College of Pharmacy
 Shivaji School of Pharmacy
 Shree Devi College of Pharmacy, Mangalore
 Shuttaria Institute of Pharmacy, Neelamangala, B.H. Road
 Siddalingeshwar College of Pharmacy, SYE Society's
 Sonia Education Trust's College of Pharmacy
 Sree Krishna College of Pharmacy, Batawadi
 Sree Siddaganga College of Pharmacy
 Sri Adichunchanagiri College of Pharmacy
 Sri K V College of Pharmacy
 Sri Ramakrishna College of Pharmacy
 Sri Subrahmanya Swamy College of Pharmacyll
 Sri Vasavi Pharmacy College
 Sri Venkateshwara College of Pharmacy, Banashankari, Iind Stage
 Srinivas College of Pharmacy
 St John's Pharmacy College
 T. John College of Pharmacy
 Tipu Sultan College of Pharmacy
 Togari Veeramallappa Memorial College of Pharmacy
 Trident Educational Society's Valley College of Pharmacy, J.C. Nagarpipe Line Road
 V.M.V.V.S. School of Pharmacy
 V.V.S.P.B. College of Pharmacy
 Vasavi Jnana Peeth College of Pharmacy, Vijay Nagar
 VES's Pharmacy College, Dharward Dist
 Vidya Vikas Trust's College of Pharmacy
 Vidya Siri College of Pharmacy
 Visveswarapura Institute of Pharmaceutical Sciences
 Vivekananda College of Pharmacy
 Vutkoor Laxmaiah College of Pharmacy

Kerala
 A.J. College of Pharmacy
 A.M. College of Pharmacy, Karunagappally
 Al-Shifa College of Pharmacy
 Amrita School of Pharmacy, Ponekkara (P.O)
 Calicut Medical College
 Caritas College of Pharmacy
 Chemists College Of Pharmaceutical Sciences And Research, Ernakulam
 College of Pharmaceutical Sciences
 College of Pharmaceutical Sciences, Gandhinagar, P.O.
 College of Pharmaceutical Sciences
 College of Pharmacy
 College of Pharmacy, Emakulam
 College of Pharmacy
 Crescent B.Pharm. College
 Dale View College of Pharmacy and Research Center
 Devaki Amma Memorial College of Pharmacy, Malappuram
 Fathima College of Pharmacy, Kallumthazham, Kollikollar
 Grace College of Pharmacy
 Institute of Pharmaceutical Sciences, Medical College P.O.,
 Jamia Salafiya Pharmacy College
 JDT Islam College of Pharmacy, Kozhikode
 John Enoch college of Pharmacy, Karamana
 Maharaja College of Pharmacy
 Malik Deenar College of Pharmacy
 Mar Dioscorus College of Pharmacy, Sreekariyam P O,
 National College of Pharmacy Manassery
 Nehru College of Pharmacy, Thiruvilwamala
 Priyadarsini Institute of Para Medical Science
 Sree Krishna College of Pharmacy & Research Centre
 St. James College of Pharmaceutical Sciences, River Bank, Chalakudy
 St. Joseph's College of Pharmacy, Vadakamcherry
 T.D. Medical College
 West Fort College Of Pharmacy, Pottore, Thrissur

Madhya Pradesh
 Adina College of Pharmacy
 B R Nahata College of Pharmacy, Mandsaur.
 Bansal Diploma Pharmacy College
 College of Pharmacy, Rejendra Nagar, A.B. Road
 Department of Pharmaceutical Sciences
 Department of Pharmacy
 Devi Ahiya College of Pharmacy, near Jaora Compound
 Dr. Shri R.M.S. Institute of Science & Technology College of Pharmacy
 Govt. Kalaniketan (Polytechinic)
 Gry Institute of Pharmacy, Sarvar Deula Road, Borwan
 Guru Ramdas Khalsa Institute of Science & Technology (Pharmacy)
 Indore Institute of Pharmacy, Opposite Indian Institute of Management Rau
 Institute of Pharmaceutical Sciences
 Mahakal Institute of Pharmaceutical Studies, Station Road, Datana
 Malhotra College of Pharmacy, Gandhi Nagar Bypass
Mittal institute of pharmacy, Bhopal
 NRI Institute of Pharmaceutical Science, (NIPS) Opp. Patel Nagar, Raisen Road
 NRI Institute of Pharmacy (NIP), Bhopal
 Oriental Institute of Science & Technology
Ravi Shankar college of pharmacy, Bhopal 462038
 R.K.D.F. Institute of Science & Technology
 Rishi Raj College of Pharmacy, Indore
 Rajiv Gandhi College of Pharmacy Bhopal, Kolar Road
 S.V.Govt. Polytechnic
 Sagar Institute of Pharmaceutical Sciences
 Shri G.S. Institute of Technology & Science, Indore
 Shri Ram Nath Singh
 Shriram College of Pharmacy, near Gwalior
 Smriti College of Pharmaceutical Education, near Dewas Naka
 Sun Institute of Pharmaceutical Education & Research (SIPER)
 Truba Institute of Pharmacy, Bhopal
 Ujjain Institute Of Pharmaceutical Sciences, Ujjain
 V.N.S. Institute of Pharmacy, Vidya Vihar, Neel

Maharashtra
 A.I.T's Institute of Pharmacy, Pharmacy Nagar
 A.S.P.M.'s K.T. Patil College of Pharmacy
 A.S.P.M's Diploma IN Pharmacy Institute, Chaadwad
 Abasaheb Kakade College of Pharmacy
 Adarsh Shikshan Sanstha's College of Pharmacy
 Agnihotri Institute of Pharmacy
 Alard College of Pharmacy, near Rajiv Gandhi Infotek Park
 All India Shri Shivaji Memorial Society's College of Pharmacy, near R.T.O.
 Allana College of Pharmacy, near Poorna College Camp
 Amrutvahini Institute of Pharmacy, Dist. Ahmednagar
 Anand Charitable Sanstha's College of Pharmacy, Tq- Ashti
 Anna Saheb Ajmera College of Pharmacy (Women), Deopur
 Annasaheb Dange College of BPharmacy
 Annasaheb Ramesh Ajmera College of Pharmacy (Women)
 Arunamai College of Pharmacy, Mumarabad, Jalgaon
 Anuradha College of Pharmacy
 Appasahib Birnale College of Pharmacy
 Armed Forces Medical College
 Arts Science, Commerce & Pharmacy
 B.V. Institute of Pharmacy
 Bhagawan Pharmacy College
 Bharati Vidyapeeth's College of Pharmacy
 Bharati Vidyapeeth's College of Pharmacy
 Bharati Vidyapeeth's Poona College of Pharmacy
 Bhausaheb Mulak College of D. Pharmacy, Umrer
 Bhinav Education Society's College of Pharmacy
 Bombay College of Pharmacy, Kalina, Mumbai
 C U Shah College of Pharmacy
 Channabasweshwar Pharmacy College
 Charak College of pharmacy & Research Wagholi, Pune
 College of Pharmacy, Pusad, Yavatmal District
 College of Pharmacy
 College of Pharmacy (Polytechnic), Post. Alore, Talq
 D.S.T.S. Mandal's College of Pharmacy
 Dayanand College of Pharmacy, Dayanand Education Society Campus
 Department of Chemical Technology
 Department of Pharmaceutical Sciences
 Deptt. Of Pharmaceutical Science, Amravathi Road
 Dr. Bhanuben Nanavati College of Pharmacy, Mithibai College Campus, V.M. Road
 Dr. L. H. Hiranandani College of Pharmacy
 Dr. J.J. Magdum Pharmacy College
 Dwarka Institute of Pharmacy
 Geetadevi Khandelwal Institute of Pharmacy, Dabki Road
 Godavari Shikshan Mandal's Asian Institute of Pharmacy, Survey No.326/2 Pathardi Road
 Gondia Education Society's Manoharbhai Patel Institute of Pharmacy
 Government College of Pharmacy, Amravati
 Government College of Pharmacy, Aurangabad
 Government College of Pharmacy, Karad
 Government College of Pharmacy, Ratnagiri
 Govt. Polytechnic
 Gulabrao Patil College of Pharmacy, near Govt. Milk Scheme, Miraj
 Gurunanak Technical Institute (Diploma in Pharmacy), Foundry & Namagar Nagar
 H K College of Pharmacy, Jogeshwari, Mumbai
 Indira College of Pharmacy, New Pune Mumbai Highway Tathwade
 Institute of Diploma in Pharmacy
 Institute of Pharmaceutical Education and Research
 Institute of Pharmacy
 Institute of Pharmacy
 Institute of Pharmacy, Deopur
 Institute of Pharmacy
 Institute of Pharmacy, Station Road Yavatmal
 J L Chaturvedi College of Pharmacy
 J.B.S.P. Mandar's Institute of Pharmacy
 J.E.S.'s Institute of Pharmacy, Durga Mata Road
 Jijamata Education Society's College of Pharmacy, Nandurbar
 K.D. Pawar College of Pharmacy
 K.D.C.A's Institute of Pharmacy, Ujalaiwadi
 K.E.S's College of Pharmacy, Manwad Road
 Kamala Nehru Polytechnic (pharmacy)
 Kamla Nehru Pharmacy
 Lokmanya Tilak Institute of Pharmaceutical Studies, Laxmi Nagar
 M.A.H. College of Pharmacy
 Maharashtra Shikshan Samiti's 'Maharashtra College of Pharmacy
 Mahatma Basweshwar Education Society's College Pharmacy, MIDC Area, Barshi Road
 MGV Mandal's College of Pharmacy, Panchvati
 Modern College of Pharmacy, Sector 21, Yamunanagar, Nigdi
 Modern College of Pharmacy (Ladies Only), Borhadewadi, A/P Moshi, Taluk. Haveli
 Moze college of Pharmacy, Wagholi, Pune
 Mula Education Society's College of Pharmacy
 Mumbai Educational Trust's Institute of Pharmacy
 N D M V P Samaj's College of Pharmacy
 N.T.V.S. Institute of Pharmacy, Dhule
 N.Y.S. Society's Nagpur College of Pharmacy
 Nagpur College of Pharmacy/Sharad Pawar College of Pharmacy, Nagpur
 Department college of Pharmacy, Nagpur
 Navyug Vidyapeeth Trust's College of Pharmacy
 NCRD's Sterling Institute of Pharmacy
 NSS College of Pharmacy, 94, Tardeo Road, M.P.Mill Compound
 Oriental College of Pharmacy, Sanpada, Navi Mumbai
 P S G V P Mandal's College of Pharmacy
 Padmashree Dr D Y Patil College of Pharmacy
 Padmashri Dr Vithalrao Patil Foundation's
 Pataldhamal Wadhwani College of Pharmacy
 Pravara Rural College of Pharmacy
 Principal K M Kundnani College of Pharmacy
 R C Patel College of Pharmacy
 Rajgad Dnyanpeeth's College of Pharmacy
 Raoji Naik Institute of Pharmacy, Buldana
 Ravi Institute of Diploma in Pharmacy, Sirapeth
 S.A.S. Polytechnic (Pharmacy), Bhiwandi
 S.C.S.MS. Institute of Pharmacy
 S.M.B.T. College of Pharmacy, Igatpuri
 Saraswati Vidya Bhawan's College of Pharmacy
 Satara Polytechnic (Dept of Pharmacy), Mangalwar Peth
 Seth Govind Raghunath Sable College of Pharmacy
 Sharad Pawer College of Pharmacy
 Sharadchandra Pawar College of Pharmacy
 Shikshan Prasark Mandal's College of Pharmacy
 Shivnagar Vidya Prasarak Mandal's College of Pharmacy
 Shree Sant Muktabai Institute of Technology (Pharmacy), P.O.Box 132
 Shree Shahu Chhatrapati Shikshan Sanstha's, Dasara Chowk
 Shri C.S. Shikshan Sanstha's SCSSS College of Pharmacy
 Shri D.F. Lodha Pharmacy College, Chaadwad
 Shri K.R. Pandav Institute of Pharmacy
 Shri Sadashivrao Patil S. Sanstha College of Pharmacy
 Shri Sharda Bhavan Education Society's College of Pharmacy, Seva Kendra
 Shri Shivaji Institute of Pharmacy, Parbhani
 Sinhgad College of Pharmacy, Narhe/Ambegaon/Lonavala/Kondhwa
 Smt Kishoritai Bhoyar College of Pharmacy
 Smt S S Patil College of Pharmacy
 Smt. Kashibai Navale College of Pharmacy, Saswad Road Kondhwa (Bk.)
 Smt. Kusumtai Wankhede Institute of Pharmacy
 Sri. Anand College of Pharmacy
 Sudhakarrao Naik Institute of Pharmacy
 Tapi Valley Education Society's College of Pharmacy
 University Deptt. Of Chemical Technology, Matunga Road
 V.J.S.M.'s Institute of Pharmacy, Junnar
 Veer Mata Hiraben P. Shah College of Pharmacy, Kasar-Vadavali, Ghodbunder Road
 Vidarbha Youth Welfare Society's Institute of Pharmacy
 Vidya Bharati College of Pharmacy
 Waghire College of Pharmacy, Saswad District
 Y B Chavan College of Pharmacy
 Yash Institute of Pharmacy
 Yashvantro Chavan College of Pharmacy, near Nagapur Bridge, near Manmad Road

Odisha
 Balangi Pharmaceutical
 College of Pharmaceutical Sciences, Ganjam
 College of Pharmaceutical Sciences, Marina Drive Road P.O. Baliguali
 The College of Pharmaceutical Science, Via Janla
 Dadhichi College of Pharmacy
 Gayatri College of Pharmacy, Jamadarpali
 Indira Gandhi Institute of Pharmaceutical Sciences
 Indira Gandhi Memorial Institute of Pharmaceutical Sciences
 Institute of Pharmaceutical Sciences & Technology, P.O. Bahugram
 Institute of Pharmaceutical Technology
 Institute of Pharmacy & Technology
 Jeypore College of Pharmacy, Koraput
 Kanak Manjari Institute of Pharmaceutical Sciences
 Mayurbhanj Medical Academy, Baripada
 Om Sai College of academy, Ganjam
 Orissa College of Pharmaceutical Science
 Pharmaceutical College, Tingipali
 Pranabandhu Institute of Paramedical Science & Technology
 Roland Institute of Pharmaceutical Science, Behampur
 Ronald Institute of Pharmaceutical Sciences, (Ganjam)
 Royal College of Pharmacy & Health Sciences, Ganjam
 S.C.B. Medical College
 School of Pharmaceutical Sciences, Sikhya Anusandhan, Khurda
 Seemanta Institute of Pharmaceutical Sciences
 Siddheswar College of Pharmaceutical Sciences
 Sri Jayadev College of Pharmaceutical Sciences
 University Department of Pharmaceutical Sciences, Utkal University, Vani Vihar, BBSR (Govt.)
 V.S.S. Medical College
 Women's Polytechnic

Anandapur Sahib
 Govt. Medical College
 Govt Polytechnic for Women
 Govt Polytechnic Institute for Women

Rajasthan
Mahatma Gandhi College of pharmaceutical sciences Jaipur
 Akashdeep College of Pharmacy, Mansarovar
 Alwar Pharmacy College
 Baba Mungipa College of Pharmacy, Jhunjhunun
 Bharti Institute of Pharmaceutical Sciences, Hanumangarh Road
 Bhupal Nobels' College of Pharmacy
 Bhupal Nobles' College of Pharmacy
 Birla Institute of Technology and Sciences
 Deepshikha College of Pharmacy
 Department of Pharmacy, University of Technology
 Deptt. Of Pharmaceutical Science
 Deptt.of Pharmaceutical Science S.M.S. Medical College
 Goenka College of Pharmacy, Khuri Bari, Lachhmangarh Road
 Gyan Vihar School of Pharmacy, Mahal Jagatpura
 Jaipur College of Pharmacy, Sitapura, Tonk Road
 Lachoo Memorial College of Science & Technology (Pharmacy)
 Lal Bahadur Shastri College of Pharmacy, Tilak Nagar
 Maharaja Surajmal Institute of Pharmacy
 Maharishi Arvind College of Pharmacy, Ambabari
 Marwar Pharmacy College
 Nehru Memorial College of Pharmacy
 Permanand College of Technology
 Regional College of Pharmacy, Jaipur
 Sanjeevan College of Pharmacy
 Sanjivani College of Pharmaceutical Sciences
 Shri Bajrang College of Pharmacy, Deeg
 Shri U.S.B. College of Pharmacy, Santpur, Abu Road
 Sri Balaji College of Pharmacy
 Sri Ganganagar Institute of Pharmaceutical Sciences, near RIICO Bus Stand
 Swami Keshvanand Institute of Pharmacy, Jaipur

Tamil Nadu
 A J College of Pharmacy
 Aadhi Bhagawan College of Pharmacy
 Adhiparasakthi College of Pharmacy, Chengai M.G.R. District
 Amrita Institute of Pharmaceutical Sciences, Elamakkara Post
 Annai Velakanni's Pharmacy College
 Antarcticaa College of Pharmacy, Palayamkottai
 Arulmigu Kalasalingam College of Pharmacy
 C L Baid Metha College of Pharmacy
 C.S. Jain College of Pharmacy, Srimushnam
 Cherraan's College of Pharmacy
 Coimbatore College of Pharmacy
 Coimbatore Medical College
 College of Allied Medical sciences, Shenoy Nagar
 College of Paramedical Sciences, Thindal Post
 College of Pharmacy
 College of Pharmacy Sri Gokulam Institute of Pharmedical Science, Premier Complex
 Department of Pharmacy, Porur
 Edayathangudy G.S. Pillay College of Pharmacy
 The Erode College of Pharmacy, Valipurathanpalayam (P.O.)
 Fathima College of Pharmacy, Nellai Kattabomman Dt.
 Institute of Pharmaceutical Technology
 J.K.K. Nattraja College of Pharmacy
 J K K Munirajah Medical Research Foundation
 J S S College of Pharmacy
 K M College of Pharmacy
 K. K. College of Pharmacy
 K.M.R. College of Pharmacy, Perundurai
 Kamalakshi Pandurangan College of Pharmacy
 KMCH College of Pharmacy
 KRS Pallavan College of Pharmacy, M.M. Avenue
 Laxmi Narayan College of Pharmacy
 Madras College of Pharmacy, Avadi
 Madras Medical College, Park Town
 Madurai Medical College
 Maharaja College of Pharmacy
 Mayor Radhakrishna Pillai Memorial College of Pharmacy
 Nadar Mahajana Sangam Jayaraj Annapackiam College of Paramedical Sciences
 Nandha College of Pharmacy
 National College of Pharmacy
 Padmavathi College of Pharmacy
 Pallavan Pharmacy College
 Pandyan College of Pharmacy, Virattipathu
 Pearl Peace Medical Mission College of Pharmacy, Nellai Kattabomman Dt.
 Periyar College of Pharmaceutical Sciences for Girls
 PGP College of Pharmaceutical Science & Research Institute
 PSG College of Pharmacy
 R V S College of Pharmaceutical Sciences
 Royal College of Pharmacy & Paramedical Science, Madukkarai
 S A Raja Pharmacy College
 S Chattanatha Karayalar College of Pharmacy
 S R M College of Pharmacy, Kanchipuram District
 S. B. College of Pharmacy
 Shoba College of Pharmacy, near Railway Station
 Sri Ramachandra College of Pharmacy, Sri Ramachandra Institute of Higher Education and Research (DU)
 Sri Ramakrishna Institute of Paramedical Science College, New Sidhapur
 Subbarayalu College of Pharmacy, Industrial Estate P.O.
 SSM College of Pharmacy
 Swamy Vivenkanandha College of Pharmacy.
 T.K. College of Pharmacy, Dharapuram Road.
 Texcity College of Pharmacy, Podanur Main road
 Thanjavur Medical College
 Thanthai Roever College of Pharmacy
 Trichy College of Pharmacy
 Ultra College of Pharmacy
 VEL's College of Pharmacy
 Venkateswara College of Pharmacy, Chennai main road, Anaikkarai, Thanjavur District
 Vinayaka Mission's College of Pharmacy

Uttar Pradesh
Department of Pharmacy, Mohammad Ali Jauhar University, Rampur, U.P.
 A. N. D. College of Pharmacy
 PharmaState.academy, offers easy access to training & up-skilling programs created by experts from Pharma Industry.
 Advanced Institute of Biotech & Paramedical Sciences
 Amity Institute of Pharmacy, Amity University Uttar Pradesh, Lucknow Campus
 Amity Institute of Pharmacy, Noida
 Anand College of Pharmacy, NH-2 Keetham
 Azad Institute of Pharmacy & Research, via Bangla Bazaar Road
 Bhagwant Institute of Pharmacy, Bhagwantpuram, Muzaffarnagar 
 BBS Institute of Pharmaceutical & Allied Sciences
 Department of Pharmaceutical Sciences
 Department of Pharmaceutical Engineering & Technology(Indian Institute of Technology- IIT(BHU), Varanasi)
 Department of Pharmacy, Bhojipura Post
 Dr. K.N. Modi Institute of Pharmaceutical Sciences & Research
 Faculty of Engineering & Technology (Department of Pharmacy)
 G.S.V.M. Medical College
 Govt. G' Polytechnic
 Govt. G' Polytechnic
 Govt. Polytechnic
 Govt. Polytechnic
 HIMT College of Pharmacy, Knowledge Park, 1 District, Gautam Budh Nagar
 Hind Institute of Medical Sciences, Barabanki Road
 HR Institute of Pharmacy, Meerut Road, Morta
 I.T.S. Paramedical (Pharmacy) College
 IIMT College of Pharmacy
 IEC college of Engineering & Technology (Department of Pharmacy), Greater Noida
 Innovative College of Pharmacy
 Institute of Pharmaceutical Sciences & Research
 Janta Polytechnic, Bhaipur
 K.G.'s Medical College
 Kamla Nehru Institute of Management and Technology, Faculty of Pharmacy
 KIET School of Pharmacy
 Krishnarpit Institute of Pharmacy, Allahabad
 L.L.R.M. Medical College
 Lucknow Model College of Pharmacy Ajeetan Khera Road Sadrauna Lucknow
7052180000
 M.L.N. Medical college
 Meerut Institute of Engineering & Technology, Bagpat Road-Bypass Crossing
 Nandini Nagar Mahavidyalaya College of Pharmacy
 NIPER Raibareli
 NKBR College of Pharmacy & Research Centre
 Om Sri Sai College of Pharmacy
 Pharmacy College Saifai, Uttar Pradesh University of Medical Sciences
 R. V. Northland Institute, Chithera Dadri
 R.K. College of Pharmacy
 Raj Kumar Goel Institute of Technology
 Rajarshi Rananjay Sinh College of Pharmacy, Amethi
 Rajiv Devi Ram Daya Mahila Polytechnic
 Rajiv Gandhi College of Pharmacy
 Rajiv Memorial Academy for Pharmacy, Mathura-Delhi Bypass Road
 Rakshpal Bahadur College of Pharmacy, Badaun Road
 S.D. College of Pharmacy
 S.N. Medical College
 Sanjay College of Pharmacy
 Saras College of Pharmacy
 Saroj Institute of Technology & Management, Lucknow-Sultanpur Road
 The Shivdan Singh Institute of Technology and Management, Aligarh-Mathura Road
 Shri Guru Ram Rai Institute of Technology & Science
 Sir Madan Lal Institute of Pharmacy
 Smt Vidyawati College of Pharmacy, Kanpur Road
 Spectrum Institute of Pharmaceutical Sciences & Research, near Kailash Hospital
 Translam Institute of Pharmaceutical Education & Research
 University Institute of Pharmacy, Kanpur
 Vishveshwarya Institute, G.T. Road, near Dadri
 SR Group of Institutions(College of Pharmacy), Ambabai, Jhansi
 SR College of Pharmaceutical Sciences, Ambabai, Jhansi
 Banaras Hindu University, Varanasi
 Sagar Institute of Technology & Management, Lucknow -Faizabad Road National Highway 27, Barabanki.

Uttarakhand
 Gyani Inder Singh Institute of Professional Studies, Dehradun
 Siddhartha Institute of Pharmacy, Dehradun

West Bengal
 BCDA College of Pharmacy & Technology, Barasat
 Bengal School Of Technology, Chinsurah
 Burdwan Institute of Pharmacy, Purba Bardhaman
 Department of Pharmaceutical Technology, P.O. Jadavpur University
 Dr. B.C. Roy College of Pharmacy and Allied Health Sciences, Bidhan Nagar
 Gupta College of Technological Science
 Guru Nanak Institute of Pharmaceutical Sciences & Technology, Sodepur
 Institute of Pharmacy, Jalpaiguri
 Netaji Subhas Chandra Bose Institute of Pharmacy
 NSHM College of Pharmaceutical Technology
 Women's Polytechnic Govt. of West Bengal

References

Pharmacy
 
India